Oberkorn (fr: Obercorn de: Oberkorn ) is a town in the commune of Differdange in south-western Luxembourg.  , the town had a population of 4,584.

Etymology 
Both the towns of Oberkorn and Niederkorn get their names from the river D'Kuer (also called as Kar, Kor or Korn) in Luxembourgish or the Chiers in English and French or Korn in German. The river Chiers is a right tributary of the Meuse. The source of the Chiers is near Oberkorn. The Chiers flows roughly in western direction, and crosses the border with Belgium and flows through Athus (province of Luxembourg).

Administration 
The administration of this town falls under the commune of Differdange together with other towns Niederkorn, Lasauvage, Differdange-Fousbann.

Education 
Oberkorn has couple of primary schools Ecole Prince Henri and Um bok.

Lunex University, located in Oberkorn offers graduate and specialist programs in physiotherapy, sport and exercise science, and sport management.

Sports 

FC Differdange 03's home stadium is located in Oberkorn. That apart the two football clubs CS Oberkorn and FC Luna Oberkorn also play in that locality. 

Oberkorn also has an outdoor and indoor swimming pool with training and coaching facilities at Aquasud.

Sports centre Parc des Sports is Differdange commune's sport complex offering martial arts, boxing and handball. 

There is also an athletic field Stade Jaminet in this town.

Places of interest 
Hall O is a dedicated indoor location to organise festivities, markets or fairs.

Espace H2O a sustainable multipurpose cultural space for art exhibitions. An old water reservoir in Oberkorn was renovated on the centennial of city of Differdange.   

The Church of Oberkorn (Luxembourgish: Uewerkuerer Kierch) is a Catholic church belonging to the Parish of Saint-François-Assise. The patron is Saint Stephen (St. Etienne), whose feast is celebrated on December 26. 

The church was consecrated on July 1, 1912, by Bishop Jean-Joseph Koppes.

Getting around 
The town of Oberkorn is served by dedicated train station connecting to Luxembourg city.

The commune of Differdange provides DiffBus - electric buses that go around the commune of Differdange.

There are also longer route bus services connecting to other communes and city of Luxembourg. 

One can get around the town of Oberkorn and the commune of Differdange on bicycles as well.

Popular Media 
The new wave band Depeche Mode released a song called "Oberkorn (It's a Small Town)", which refers to the town, as a B-side on their 1982 single "The Meaning of Love". 

In addition, Depeche Mode also used "Oberkorn (It's a Small Town)" as a prelude to "My Secret Garden" from the album A Broken Frame when recorded live at the Hammersmith Odeon, now named HMV Hammersmith Apollo.

Spanish techno group OBK, from the song by Depeche Mode, also makes an indirect reference to the town.

A song by the band Petrograd (Luxembourgish punk band) is called Uewerkuer. 

Oberkorn is also the name of a British-made model of analogue step sequencers made by Analogue Solutions.

References

Differdange
Towns in Luxembourg